Yuriy Valentynovych Batyushyn (born 7 December 1992) is a Ukrainian professional footballer who plays as a midfielder for Dila Gori in the Erovnuli Liga.

Career

Stal Alchevsk
Yuriy Batyushyn was born on 7 December 1992 in Alchevsk. He is a youth product of Stal Alchevsk, where he played for the youth squads from 1999 to 2009. He played 78 matches and scored nine goals in the Ukrainian Youth League for Stal. From 2008 to 2011 he played for Stal-2 Alchevsk in the Luhansk Oblast Championship. He made his senior debut on 24 July 2011 against Odessa, coming on in the 90th minute for Anton Postupalenko. He scored his first goal for Stal on 29 October against Lviv. During his tenure at Stal, he played 84 matches and scored 13 goals.

Mykolaiv
At the end of April 2015, he joined Mykolaiv. He made his debut for Mykolaiv on 25 April against Sumy. Yuriy was named to the starting lineup, and in the 29th minute he was replaced by Andriy Burdiyan. His debut goal came on 23 May against Poltava.

At the end of the first half of the 2020–21 season, he was named as the best central midfielder of the Ukrainian First League according to the online edition SportArena.

Metalist 1925 Kharkiv
On 25 December 2020 he signed with Metalist 1925 Kharkiv.

Dila Gori
In summer 2022, he moved to Dila Gori.

References

External links
 Statistics at UAF website (Ukr)
 

1992 births
Living people
People from Alchevsk
Ukrainian footballers
Ukrainian expatriate footballers
FC Stal Alchevsk players
MFC Mykolaiv players
FC Hirnyk-Sport Horishni Plavni players
FC Metalist 1925 Kharkiv players
FC Dila Gori players
Ukrainian Premier League players
Ukrainian First League players
Erovnuli Liga players
Association football midfielders
Expatriate footballers in Georgia (country)
Ukrainian expatriate sportspeople in Georgia (country)
Sportspeople from Luhansk Oblast